The 1909 Princeton Tigers football team represented Princeton University in the 1909 college football season. The team finished with a 6–2–1 record under first-year head coach Jim McCormick. No Princeton players were selected as first-team honorees on the 1909 College Football All-America Team.

Schedule

References

Princeton
Princeton Tigers football seasons
Princeton Tigers football